Eastside Technical Center is a public high school located in Lexington, Kentucky, United States, within the Fayette County Public School System. The school goes beyond this boundary, Eastside Technical Center serves students from all public high schools in Fayette, Jessamine, Scott, and Woodford Counties.

Their mission is to prepare their students for entry level technical occupations, two-year community colleges, or two-year technical colleges and four-year universities.

Academics
This Public High School Technical Center does this by providing many different vocational programs such as:
 Automotive and Transportation Technology
 Diesel Technology
 Automotive Collision Repair
 Cinematography and Video/Studio Production
 Digital Design & Game Development
 Fire & Emergency Services
 Law Enforcement and Homeland Security

Eastside Technical Center also offers academic or core classes for students, these include:
 Geometry
 Algebra II
 Advanced U.S. History
 Humanities (History of Rock and Roll)

History

The Eastside Technical Center opened their doors in 1978 under the name Northside Vocational Center. And like most technical centers across the state of Kentucky today, the school was operated and managed by the Kentucky Department of Education. Tom Wilson was the principal of Eastside Technical Center from its opening in 1978 to 1999.

When the school opened, students had the choice of the following programs of study:
 Auto
 Diesel
 Machine Tool Technology
 Industrial Mechanics
 Electricity
 Welding
 Horticulture
 Graphic Arts
 Health Sciences

Then Fayette County Public Schools took control of the technical center in 1987, thus renaming it "Eastside Technical Center." And some of the courses were then moved to Southside Technical Center, and some new were added to Eastside Technical Center.

Eastside is accredited by the Southern Association of Colleges and Schools.

Administration

The principal is Wade Stanfield.

Career pathways

Transportation Technology

Transportation Technology Department at Eastside Technical Center includes courses in Automotive Collision Repair, Automotive Technology, and Diesel Mechanics. These courses are designed to prepare students for employment or post-secondary education. According to the U.S. Department of Labor, for students to qualify for employment in the transportation industry they must possess diagnostic and problem-solving skills, knowledge of electronics, and strong reading, math, and computer skills. To which the Automotive and Transportation courses at Eastside Technical Center emphasize these skills as students learn the new technologies needed for careers in these increasingly sophisticated fields.

Homeland Security

The Homeland Security Department at Eastside includes courses relating to anti-terrorism and terrorism awareness, criminal justice, emergency management, emergency medical services, fire

sciences, field based forensic sciences, and law enforcement. These courses are designed to prepare students for post-secondary education, military services, and the professional services. Students are required to participate in demanding physical training that follows standards established for law enforcement and firefighting personnel. This program has enhanced entry and retention requirements as well as an enhanced code of conduct. A mandatory orientation session is also held prior to the start of the new school year. Students who successfully complete the program can have the opportunity to earn up to six federal professional certifications.

Media Arts/Information Technology  
Students enrolled in Eastside Technical Center for Cinematography and Video Production Program are learning what it takes to be successful in today's face paced multi-media world. With the many options available today for media and news information, these students learn about all of them: reporting and anchoring for television, videography, editing, behind the scenes new production, podcasting, blogging, composing original music for newscasts, and storytelling through digital photography. The students at Eastside Technical Center have access to the most up to date equipment, they use the same editing software that academy award-winning blockbusters are edited with. The students enrolled in these courses have the creative freedom to explore storytelling and turn their vision into multi-media masterpieces.

Clubs

Eastside Technical Center is a partner in the following clubs: Skills USA, STLP, and the National Technical Honor Society.

References

External links
 

Schools in Lexington, Kentucky
Public high schools in Kentucky